Nowa Dęba  is a town in Tarnobrzeg County, Subcarpathian Voivodeship, Poland, with a population of 11,310, as of 2 June 2009. Nowa Dęba belongs to historic Lesser Poland, and is located in the Sandomierz Forest, along European route E371. Near the town is the Tarnobrzeg Special Economic Zone (TSSE), as well as a large military training area of the Polish Army. Nowa Dęba has a sports club Stal, established in 1953.

Like Stalowa Wola, Nowa Dęba is a town which owes its existence to the Central Industrial Region. In the late 1930s, the government of the Second Polish Republic decided to build the Ammunition Factory Nr. 3 in the forest village of Dęba. The Polish government chose this location because of the already-existing Army training area, where ammunition was tested. In 1938, the construction of a workers’ settlement began, with a school, hospital, cafeteria, houses, swimming pool and blocks of flats. 
 
During World War II, the factory and training area in Dęba were used by the Germans. In 1944, the settlement was captured by the Red Army, and in the People's Republic of Poland, the Ammunition Factory Nr. 3 was renamed to Metal Plant DEZAMET. Apart from military products, the plant also manufactured engines and clothes irons. Dęba was granted town rights on December 31, 1961, and on the same day, its name was changed to Nowa Dęba, or New Dęba.

International relations

Twin towns — Sister cities

  Sukhovolya, Ukraine

Former twin towns:

  Fermoy, Ireland

On 12 October 2020, the Irish city of Fermoy ended its twin town partnership with Nowa Dęba as a reaction to the LGBT-free zone declaration adopted by the Polish city's authorities. On 28 January 2021, the Nowa Dęba's council voted to revoke the controversial declaration. The decision was welcomed by the LGBT community and activists.

References
Notes

External links
Official town webpage

Cities and towns in Podkarpackie Voivodeship
Tarnobrzeg County
Kingdom of Galicia and Lodomeria
Lwów Voivodeship